North Kawnpui is a census town in Kolasib district in the Indian state of Mizoram.

N. Kawnpui is a Notified Town city in district of Kolasib, Mizoram. The N. Kawnpui city is divided into 2 wards for which elections are held every 5 years. The N. Kawnpui Notified Town has population of 7,732 of which 3,892 are males while 3,840 are females as per report released by Census India 2011.

Population of Children with age of 0-6 is 1178 which is 15.24 % of total population of N. Kawnpui (NT). In N. Kawnpui Notified Town, Female Sex Ratio is of 987 against state average of 976. Moreover Child Sex Ratio in N. Kawnpui is around 997 compared to Mizoram state average of 970. Literacy rate of N. Kawnpui city is 97.35 % higher than state average of 91.33 %. In N. Kawnpui, Male literacy is around 97.24 % while female literacy rate is 97.45 %. 

N. Kawnpui Notified Town has total administration over 1,726 houses to which it supplies basic amenities like water and sewerage. It is also authorize to build roads within Notified Town limits and impose taxes on properties coming under its jurisdiction.

OFFICE

The main government offices in N. Kawnpui are:-

1. Sub Divisional Officer (Civil) or SDO(C)

2. Sub Divisional Police Officer or SDPO

3. Sub Divisional Education Officer or SDEO

4. Sub Divisional Officer (Power & Electricity Dept) or SDO(P&E)

5. Sub Divisional Officer (Public Health Engineering Dept) or SDO(PHED)

6. Sub Divisional Officer (Public Works Dept) or SDO(PWD)

7. Sub Divisional Agriculture Officer or SDAO

References

Kolasib
Cities and towns in Kolasib district